Francesco Giovanelli (2 April 1871 – 7 October 1945) was a sailor from Italy, who represented his country at the 1928 Summer Olympics in Amsterdam, Netherlands.

References

External links
 

Italian male sailors (sport)
Sailors at the 1928 Summer Olympics – 8 Metre
Olympic sailors of Italy
1871 births
1945 deaths